Markku Juhola (born 2 November 1947) is a Finnish sprinter. He competed in the men's 200 metres at the 1972 Summer Olympics.

References

1947 births
Living people
Athletes (track and field) at the 1972 Summer Olympics
Finnish male sprinters
Olympic athletes of Finland
Place of birth missing (living people)